Healing Season is the ninth studio album, and the first Christmas album, by American R&B band Mint Condition. It earned the group a nomination for Best R&B Album in the 59th Annual Grammy Awards, which were held on February 12, 2017.

Track listing 
 Santa Claus Goes Straight to the Ghetto - 4:12
 Healing Season - 5:53
 1st Snowfall - 3:52
 Little Drummer Boy - 4:16
 Not What I Wanted - 4:36
 Lonely Christmas - 4:43
 A Child Is Born - 5:13
 Someday at Christmas - 3:13
 Have Yourself a Merry Little Christmas - 4:48
 1 Brand Name

References

2015 Christmas albums
Mint Condition (band) albums